Malinovsky (masculine) or Malinovskaya (feminine) is a Slavic surname.

Notable people with the surname include:

Mikhail Malinovsky, Hero of the Soviet Union
Rodion Malinovsky (1898–1967), Soviet military commander and the Defense Minister of the Soviet Union
Roman Malinovsky (1876–1918), agent provocateur of the Okhrana
Vasily Demut-Malinovsky (1779–1846), Russian sculptor
Vasily Malinovsky (1765–1814), Russian publicist and enlightener
Malinovsky, real last name of Alexander Bogdanov (1873–1928), Russian physician, philosopher, economist, science fiction writer, and revolutionary

See also
Malinowski, variants of this last name in related languages
Malinovsky (urban-type settlement), an urban-type settlement in Khanty–Mansi Autonomous Okrug, Russia
Malinovsky, Altai Krai

References